The 2020 Summer Olympics in Tokyo were televised by a number of broadcasters throughout the world.  As with previous years, Olympic Broadcasting Services will produce the world feed provided to local broadcasters for use in their coverage. In most regions, broadcast rights to the 2018 and 2020 Olympics were packaged together, but some broadcasters obtained rights to further games as well.

Broadcasters
In Europe, this was the second Olympics under the IOC's exclusive pan-European rights deal with Eurosport, which began at the 2018 Winter Olympics. The rights for the 2020 Games cover almost all of Europe, excluding France due to an existing rights deal that will expire following these Games, and Russia. Eurosport will sub-license coverage to free-to-air networks in each territory, and also air coverage on Discovery Inc.-owned channels in some regions. In the United Kingdom, these will be the last Games whose rights are fully owned by the BBC, although as a condition of a sub-licensing agreement that will carry into the 2022 and 2024 Games, Discovery holds exclusive pay television rights to these Games.

2020 is similarly the final year of France Télévisions' rights in France (similarly to the BBC, it will also sub-license the 2022 and 2024 Games from Eurosport). Canal+ sold its pay television rights in France to Eurosport, citing internal cost-cutting measures.

Notes

References

2020
2020
Olympics on Canadian television
Olympics on United States television
2020 Summer Olympics